Carbon storage regulator A (CsrA) is an RNA binding protein. The CsrA homologs are found in most bacterial species, in the pseudomonads they are called repressor of secondary metabolites (RsmA and RsmE). The CsrA proteins generally bind to the Shine-Dalgarno sequence of messenger RNAs and either inhibit translation or facilitate mRNA decay.

CsrA has a regulatory effect on glycogen biosynthesis and catabolism, glycolysis, biofilm formation and quorum sensing.

Interactions

The CsrA protein binds to a Stem-loop RNA motif. The ability of the protein to inhibit translation of bound mRNAs can be countered by the expression of sRNAs such as CsrB, CsrC, RsmZ, RsmY and RsmX that contain multiple copies of the RNA motif. These RNAs sequester CsrA, which allows the translation of the previously inhibited bound mRNAs. A study investigating specific binding of CsrA in the Salmonella transcriptome has identified 467 binding sites.

References

Protein domains
Protein complexes